Beaver Creek is a stream in Hickman County, Tennessee, in the United States. It is a tributary of Piney River.

Beaver Creek was named for the numerous North American beavers found there by hunters.

See also
List of rivers of Tennessee

References

Rivers of Hickman County, Tennessee
Rivers of Tennessee